Petr Petrov may refer to:

Petr Petrov (boxer) (born 1983), Russian boxer
Petr Petrov (weightlifter) (born 1989), Czech weightlifter